Until 2015 the Navy Midshipmen football team, who represent the United States Naval Academy were an independent school in the NCAA Division I Football Bowl Subdivision (FBS). Since the start of the 2015 season Navy has been a member of the American Athletic Conference.  The Midshipmen have played in 24 post-season bowl games and have a record of twelve wins, eleven losses, and one tie.

Prior to the school's first true bowl game, a team of Navy players from Naval Station Great Lakes played in the 1919 Rose Bowl; however, that game during World War I was not a true college football game, since it drew teams from the armed services personnel. Navy's first post-season bowl game was at the conclusion of the 1923 college football season, when they played the Washington Huskies in the 1924 Rose Bowl. During the Great Depression in 1930 and 1931, the Midshipmen played the Army Cadets before large crowds at Yankee Stadium (1923) in postseason charity games, with Army winning both contests.

With the exception of the 1942 season, Navy finished each season between 1941 and 1945 ranked in the top ten teams in the Associated Press College Poll, but did not play in a bowl game. The Midshipmen ranked in the top five teams in the Associated Press poll after the 1954, 1957, 1960, and 1963 college football seasons, and played in the 1955 Sugar Bowl, the 1958 Cotton Bowl Classic, the 1961 Orange Bowl, and the 1964 Cotton Bowl Classic, respectively. At its second appearance at the Cotton Bowl Classic, Heisman Trophy winner Roger Staubach led the Midshipmen against the undefeated Texas Longhorns in a 28–6 loss.

After coach Wayne Hardin's departure in 1964, the Midshipmen did not play in a bowl game until the inaugural edition of the Holiday Bowl in 1978. After sporadic bowl game appearances in the 1980s and 90s, Navy hired coach Paul Johnson in 2002. Using an updated form of the triple option offense, Johnson led the team to five straight bowl appearances between 2002 and 2006. Two weeks prior to the 2007 Poinsettia Bowl, Johnson left Navy to coach the Georgia Tech Yellow Jackets. He was replaced by Ken Niumatalolo, who has led the team to bowl games in six out of the last seven seasons. Most recently, the Midshipmen won the 2015 Military Bowl against the Pittsburgh Panthers. Navy became a football-only member of the American Athletic Conference (formerly the Big East Conference) in 2015. Among the conference's bowl game tie-ins will be the Military Bowl, which moved to Navy–Marine Corps Memorial Stadium beginning in 2013.

Key

Bowl games

Game capsules

1924 Rose Bowl

The first bowl game the Midshipmen participated in came at the conclusion of the 1923 college football season, when they were given a bid to play in the tenth edition of the Rose Bowl game. The Midshipmen, led by coach Bob Folwell, finished the regular season with five wins, one loss, and two ties (5-1-2). Their lone loss came at the hands of the Penn State Nittany Lions, falling 21–3. One of the Midshipmen's two ties came in the Army–Navy Game. Navy's opponents in the Rose Bowl were the Washington Huskies, who came in with a record of ten wins and one loss (10-1).

The game kicked off on January 1, 1924 in the Rose Bowl amidst the Tournament of Roses Parade. The first quarter went scoreless, but the Midshipmen scored twice during the second quarter: on a pass from quarterback Ira McKee and from a short run by McKee. The Huskies scored once on a long run from running back George "Wildcat" Wilson. The Midshipmen relied heavily on passing plays, while the Huskies relied on their running game the first half.

The third quarter also went scoreless. The Midshipmen effectively controlled the Huskies during most of the fourth quarter, until they fumbled the ball on their own 10-yard line. Washington scored on a trick play from the Midshipmen 12-yard line, tying the game. The Midshipmen tried to score, but turned the ball over at midfield. Washington took the ball down to the Navy 20-yard line, but were unable to score again. The Huskies missed a last-second field goal, and the game ended 14–14 tie.

1955 Sugar Bowl

The 1955 Sugar Bowl took place on January 1 – 31 years after Navy's first bowl game – following the conclusion of the 1954 college football season. The Midshipmen finished the regular season with a 7–2 record, with their two losses coming by fewer than seven points. The team entered the game ranked fifth in the nation by the AP Poll and the United Press International (UPI) poll. The Midshipmen faced the sixth-ranked Ole Miss Rebels, who, with a record of 10–1, were the Southeastern Conference (SEC) champions.

The Midshipmen scored on the game's opening drive, off a three-yard run by running back Joe Gattuso. The Navy defense shut down the Ole Miss offense the first half, holding them to three first downs. The Rebels' longest drive during the first half went for a total of 16 yards. Neither team scored during the second quarter, although the Midshipmen managed to get within one yard of the Ole Miss goal line. Navy led at the half with a 7–0 lead.

Navy controlled the third quarter by running the ball repeatedly. On a fourth down conversion attempt from the Ole Miss 16-yard line, Midshipmen kicker John Weaver caught a pass from quarterback George Welsh in the back of the end zone, giving Navy a 14-point lead. The Midshipmen stopped the Rebels on their next drive, but Rebels quarterback Eagle Day punted the ball 72 yards to the Midshipmen 7-yard line. The Midshipmen drove down the field in three plays, and Gattuso ran the ball in for another touchdown from two yards out. The Midshipmen defense shut out the Rebels' offense during the fourth quarter. By the end of the game, the Rebels had gained 121 yards of total offense, compared to the Midshipmen's 442.

1958 Cotton Bowl Classic

The 1958 Cotton Bowl Classic was played between the Navy Midshipmen and the Rice Owls on January 1, 1958. Coming into the game, Navy's record was 8-1-1 under head coach Eddie Erdelatz; Rice's was 7-3 under coach Jess Neely. The game was the only bowl that year to feature two of the nation's top ten teams: Navy was ranked fifth in the nation, while Rice was eighth. Approximately 75,500 spectators attended the game.

The game was expected to be a contest between quarterbacks Tom Forrestal (Navy) and King Hill (Rice), both of whom had been named to the 1957 College Football All-America Team. After Hill struggled early, however, he was replaced by Frank Ryan on the team's third possession. By the end of the first half, the Owls had managed only one first down, and the Midshipmen led 13–0. The Midshipmen extended that lead to 20–0 in the third quarter before Rice scored its only touchdown following an interception. The game ended in a 20-7 Navy victory; it was the Owls' first ever postseason loss. Navy's Tom Forrestal and Tony Stremic were named the game's MVPs. Both Forrestal and Ryan broke the previous bowl record for completions, set the previous year by Chuck Curtis, with 13 each.

1961 Orange Bowl

Among the 71,218 attendees for the 1961 Orange Bowl was newly elected President John F. Kennedy. The game featured the fifth-ranked Missouri Tigers, who were the champions of the Big Eight Conference, and the fourth-ranked Navy Midshipmen. The contest quickly became a defensive battle early in the first quarter: Navy defensive back Greg Mather scored first for the Midshipmen after intercepting a lateral pass and running it 98 yards for a touchdown. Two drives later, Missouri's Norm Beal intercepted a pass and ran it 90 yards for another touchdown, making the score 7–6 at the end of the first quarter. The first offensive points of the game came when Missouri quarterback Ron Taylor ran in for a touchdown in the second quarter. halfback Joe Bellino, who had won the Heisman Trophy earlier that year, was held to four yards of rushing for the game, although he did score a touchdown on a pass intended for another receiver late in the game. Navy finished the game with four interceptions, while Missouri fumbled the ball five times, losing possession three times.

1964 Cotton Bowl Classic

The 1964 Cotton Bowl was played between the second-ranked Navy Midshipmen and the first-ranked Texas Longhorns. Navy was 9-1-0 and led by Heisman Trophy winner Roger Staubach. Texas was 10-0-0 and the AP national champion (the AP poll did not publish polls after the bowls at the time, so Texas was the season-ending AP No. 1 regardless of the outcome of the game). The game took place on January 1, 1964. Texas defeated Navy with a score of 28–6. The attendance was approximately 75,300. The game's MVP's were Texas' Scott Appleton and Duke Carlisle. Navy was coached by Wayne Hardin and Texas by Darrell Royal This was the first time the Cotton Bowl hosted both the No. 1 and No. 2 teams in the nation. It is just the second No. 1 vs No. 2 bowl game in college football history, the first being the 1963 Rose Bowl.

1978 Holiday Bowl

1980 Garden State Bowl

1981 Liberty Bowl

1996 Aloha Bowl

After playing a first half that saw both teams combine for an NCAA bowl game record 68 points, Navy defeated the California Bears by keeping them to a field goal in the second half. Midshipmen quarterback Chris McCoy completed 9 of 13 passes for 277 yards, setting NCAA bowl game records for most yards per pass attempt (21.3) and most yards per completion (30.8).

2003 Houston Bowl

2004 Emerald Bowl

The Midshipmen entered the Emerald Bowl with a 9–2 record, its best win–loss record since the 1963 season. Against the New Mexico Lobos, the team jumped to an early 21–7 lead. In the third quarter, the Midshipmen began a drive that would eventually comprise 26 plays and use almost 15 minutes of game time, setting a new NCAA record for the longest drive in a college football game. The Midshipmen won the game with a score of 34–19, giving the team 10 wins for the season for the first time since the 1905 season. As a result of the win, the Midshipmen finished the season ranked 24th in both the Associated Press and the USA Today Coaches' Poll. The game's attendance of 28,856, an increase of 28 percent over the previous year, also set an Emerald Bowl record.

2005 Poinsettia Bowl

The inaugural edition of the Poinsettia Bowl was played between the Navy Midshipmen and the Colorado State Rams. Navy's record was 8–3, while Colorado State's was 6–5. The game took place on December 22, 2005, and the Midshipmen defeated the Rams 51–30. The attendance was 36,842. Midshipmen Reggie Campbell, who tied the NCAA record for most points scored in a bowl game with 30, received the game's offensive MVP award. Navy's Tyler Tidwell won the Defensive MVP award. Navy was coached by Paul Johnson and Sonny Lubick led Colorado State.

2006 Meineke Car Care Bowl

2007 Poinsettia Bowl

The 2007 Poinsettia Bowl was played between the Navy Midshipmen and the Utah Utes. Navy had a record of 8–4. Utah also had a record of 8–4. The game took place on December 20, 2007. Utah defeated Navy 35–32. The attendance was 39, 129. The game's MVP was Utah's Brian Johnson. Navy was coached by Ken Niumatalolo. Utah by Kyle Whittingham.

2008 EagleBank Bowl

2009 Texas Bowl

2010 Poinsettia Bowl

2012 Kraft Fight Hunger Bowl

2013 Armed Forces Bowl

2014 Poinsettia Bowl

2015 Military Bowl

2016 Armed Forces Bowl

2017 Military Bowl

2019 Liberty Bowl

Notes

Appearances table

Sortable table

References
Footnotes

Bibliography

Navy Midshipmen

Navy Midshipmen bowl games